Aleksandra Lazarević (born 29 November 1995) is a Serbian footballer who plays as a defender for Zenit and has appeared for the Serbia women's national team.

Career
Lazarević has been capped for the Serbia national team, appearing for the team during the 2019 FIFA Women's World Cup qualifying cycle.

References

External links
 
 
 

1995 births
Living people
Serbian women's footballers
Serbia women's international footballers
Women's association football defenders
Ryazan-VDV players